Union of Communist Militants (abbreviated EMK ) was an Iranian communist group. It was led by Mansoor Hekmat. Hekmat founded the group in December 1978. The organization took part in the Iranian Revolution of 1979 — marked by the creation of workers' councils (shoras).

Because of mounting repression in Iran, the organisation sought refuge in Kurdistan in 1981. In Kurdistan, the organization merged with a Kurdish group of Maoist roots, Komala Party of Iranian Kurdistan. Together, they formed the Communist Party of Iran (CPI) in September 1983.

References

Left-wing militant groups in Iran
Political parties of the Iranian Revolution
Banned communist parties
Banned political parties in Iran
Defunct communist parties in Iran